The Georgian Triangle is the name of a geographic region in Southern Ontario containing the counties surrounding Georgian Bay, mostly Nottawasaga Bay, in particular. The main urban centres in the region are Collingwood, Owen Sound, and situated on Lake Simcoe Barrie and Orillia.  Recreation and tourism are important parts of this area's economy, with cottages being one of the primary real estates along the coastline.  

The area overlaps two other regions in Southern Ontario: Southwestern Ontario in the western half and Central Ontario in the eastern half.  Some sources include the western half (Bruce and Grey counties) in a subset of Southwestern Ontario called Midwestern Ontario, which stretches southward from those counties to Haldimand and Norfolk counties on Lake Erie). Historically, the Georgian Triangle once formed the western part of "cottage country" in Ontario, but most properties are now lived in year-round.  Cottage country is now more associated with areas further north, namely Muskoka, Parry Sound and Haliburton, although cottages are still common on the Bruce Peninsula at the west end of the triangle.

Counties
The counties contained in the Georgian Triangle are:

 Bruce
 Grey
 Simcoe County
These are coloured red on the inset map.

The county of Dufferin and the District Municipality of Muskoka are sometimes considered part of the Georgian Triangle and are coloured green.  The District of Parry Sound is also situated on Georgian Bay.

See also
List of regions of Canada

Geographic regions of Ontario
Georgian Bay